Michael Repper (born September 25, 1990) is an orchestral conductor, the youngest American to win the Grammy Award for Best Orchestral Performance. He is the music director of the New York Youth Symphony, the Ashland Symphony Orchestra, and the Mid-Atlantic Symphony Orchestra. He was the conducting fellow of the Baltimore Symphony Orchestra from 2014 to 2016.

Early life and education
Repper was born in Orange, California to Claudia Gold Repper, an emergency physician, and David Repper. He graduated from the Orange County School of the Arts in 2008, and received a Bachelors of Arts (2012) and Masters of Arts in Music (2013) from Stanford University. In 2022, he graduated from the Peabody Conservatory of Music as a Doctor of Musical Arts, a student of Marin Alsop and Gustav Meier.

Career

Early career
Repper grew up in Orange County, California and attended the Pacific Symphony's family concerts with his grandmother, where he was inspired to take piano lessons. He was invited to study piano in Melbourne, Australia with Nehama Patkin when he was 8 years old, and it was in Australia that he conducted an orchestra for the first time. After he returned to the United States when he was 9, he began to study conducting formally with Marin Alsop. After attending Stanford University, Michael attended the Peabody Conservatory of Music, where he studied with Gustav Meier and served as the Assistant Conductor of the Peabody Orchestras and Choruses. He was also the Conducting Fellow of the Baltimore Symphony.

Music director
In 2016, Repper became the 17th music director of the New York Youth Symphony, which performs at Carnegie Hall. Under his direction, the New York Youth Symphony earned international honors, winning a Classical Digital Award in 2020 and the Grammy Award for Best Orchestral Performance in 2023, becoming the first youth orchestra in history to achieve this recognition.

Repper became the music director of the Ashland Symphony Orchestra and the Mid-Atlantic Symphony Orchestra in 2022. He is regularly seen as a guest conductor in the United States and around the world.

Honors and achievements
 2020, 2021, 2022 Solti Foundation US Career Assistance Awards
 Classical Music Digital Award 2020: Best Lockdown Project (Mahler Symphony No. 1, Mvt 2 – New York Youth Symphony)
 #1 Billboard Traditional Classical Chart: Works by Florence Price, Jessie Montgomery, Florence Price (New York Youth Symphony)

Grammy Awards

References

External links
 Official website
 New York Youth Symphony Artistic Profile
 Carnegie Hall Performance History
 Repper on Classical Minnesota Public Radio
 An Album of Unity: Gramophone Magazine

1990 births
Living people
American conductors (music)
20th-century American conductors (music)
21st-century American conductors (music)
20th-century American musicians